James Randolph Dudley (September 27, 1909 – February 12, 1999) was an American sportscaster, best known as the play-by-play voice of Major League Baseball's Cleveland Indians for nearly two decades.

Biography
A native of Alexandria, Virginia, Dudley majored in chemistry at the University of Virginia. He turned to broadcasting in the late 1930s, starting out at a Charlottesville radio station. He moved up to calling Chicago Cubs and Chicago White Sox games from 1938–1941 before serving as a pilot in the U.S. Army Air Forces during World War II.

Dudley was the Indians' lead announcer from 1948 until his firing by the club in January 1968. In 1969, Dudley broadcast for the expansion Seattle Pilots; when the club moved to Milwaukee and became the Brewers the following year, he did not join them. Dudley broadcast for a number of minor league teams in the 1970s before retiring. As an announcer, Dudley was known for his friendly, homespun style and his signature catchphrases: "Hello, baseball fans everywhere" (to start a broadcast), "The string is out" (describing a full count on a hitter), "A swing and a miss!-he struck him out", "That ball is going...going...gone!" (to describe a home run) and "So long and lots of good luck, you hear?" (signing off at the game's end – "you hear" sounded more like "ya he-ah?" in Dudley's vocal inflection).

Dudley was also a popular advertising pitchman in Cleveland, remembered primarily for his radio and television commercials for the Aluminum Siding Corporation (Garfield 1-2323) and Kahn's Hot Dogs – "the wien-ah the world awaited," in Dudley's unique parlance.

Dudley called the 1954 World Series and  All-Star Game for the Mutual network, and 1961's first All-Star Game for NBC Radio.

In addition to baseball, Dudley also broadcast football at various times for the Ohio State University, the University of Washington, and the NFL's  Cleveland Browns, Detroit Lions and Baltimore Colts.

Dudley was presented with the Ford C. Frick Award from the Baseball Hall of Fame in 1997. He died at age 89 in Tucson, Arizona.

References

 Jimmy Dudley Ford C. Frick Award biography at the National Baseball Hall of Fame

External links
 

1909 births
1999 deaths
American radio sports announcers
Baltimore Colts announcers
Chicago Cubs announcers
Chicago White Sox announcers
Cleveland Browns announcers
Cleveland Indians announcers
Detroit Lions announcers
Ford C. Frick Award recipients
Major League Baseball broadcasters
Minor League Baseball broadcasters
National Football League announcers
Ohio State Buckeyes football announcers
People from Alexandria, Virginia
Military personnel from Tucson, Arizona
Seattle Pilots announcers
United States Army Air Forces pilots of World War II
University of Virginia alumni
Washington Huskies football announcers